Devils Backbone (also Devil's Backbone) is a ridge and rock outcrop located in Highland County, Virginia, United States.

This formation gives the ridge its name of Devils Backbone, as the outcrop has been described "like the vertebrae of some monstrous prehistoric animal". The formation has also been described as resembling that of "the comb on the head of a domestic fowl".

References

Geography of Highland County, Virginia